The playoffs of the 2014 Fed Cup Europe/Africa Zone Group I were the final stages of the Group I zonal competition involving teams from Europe and Africa. Using the positions determined in their pools, the sixteen teams faced off to determine their placing in the 2014 Fed Cup Europe/Africa Zone Group I. The top two teams advanced to World Group II Play-offs, and the bottom two teams were relegated to the Europe/Africa Zone Group II.

Pool results

Promotional play-offs 
The first placed teams of each pool were drawn in head-to-head rounds. The winner of each round advanced to the World Group II Play-offs.

Netherlands vs. Belarus

Romania vs. Ukraine

5th to 8th play-offs 
The second placed teams of each pool were drawn in head-to-head rounds to find the equal fifth and seventh placed teams.

Belgium vs. Portugal

Hungary vs. Israel

9th to 12th play-offs 
The third placed teams of each pool were drawn in head-to-head rounds to find the equal ninth and the eleventh placed teams.

Croatia vs. Turkey

Great Britain vs. Austria

Relegation play-offs 
The last placed teams of each pool were drawn in head-to-head rounds. The loser of each round was relegated to the Europe/Africa Zone Group II in 2015.

Luxembourg vs. Bulgaria

Latvia vs. Slovenia

Final placements 

  and  advanced to World Group II play-offs.

References

External links 
 Fed Cup website

P1